The Tiger Bay Warriors were a Junior American flag football team established in Cardiff in 1993. After initial success, and rising to the senior level, a loss of key players halted the momentum and the team folded in 2000.

History

Tiger Bay Warriors (1993 to 2000)
The club was formed in 1993 as the Tiger Bay Warriors, and started out as a Junior Flag team. They were accepted into Junior Division Two Touch and recorded a 4–0–0 record in the regular season (including one postponed game against the Gloucester Gladiators which was awarded to the Warriors) before narrowly losing the bowl game 6–8 to the London Capitals.

The following two years, the Warriors played at Youth Kitted level. In 1994 season they won the BYAFA South East Division with a perfect 8–0 record and reached the playoff semi-final. In 1995, they recorded a 2–3 season in the Southern Division but still managed to reach the playoffs, losing 0–8 to the London Capitals in their quarter-final.

The decision was then taken to move up to senior level, and the Warriors were admitted to the Southwest Conference of the British Senior League's third division. Their experience in their previous youth tournaments seemed to serve them well as their first season at this level saw them post an 8–2 record, finishing second in their conference. They went on the reach the playoff semi-final before losing to the eventual divisional champions, the Winchester Rifles. They reached the play-offs once again in 1997 after finishing second in their conference, only to be forced to withdraw from their playoff match against the PA Knights due to an acute player shortage.

As with the year before, the Warriors finished the 1998 regular season in second place, tied with the Southern Sundevils with a 7–1 record but with an inferior points difference. As a result, they lost home advantage for their playoff match and this proved crucial as they went down by a single point to the London Mets. The following year, they once again finished the regular season with a 7–1 record tied with the Hertfordshire Stags and the Sabres, but they avoided last season's disappointment by finishing top on points difference. This paid off as they made it all the way to the divisional play-off final before losing a tight final game against the Chester Romans by just two points.

Unfortunately the Warriors were unable to build on this success. After losing several key players and the services of Head Coach Rob Mota, they were forced to withdraw from the league in 2000 and subsequently the team disbanded.

Stadium
With the team based in Cardiff with most of their games were played at Canton rugby club, Channel View Leisure Centre and Roath Park.

Senior team season records

References

BAFA National League teams
American football teams in Wales
Sport in Cardiff
1993 establishments in Wales
2000 disestablishments in Wales
American football teams established in 1993
American football teams disestablished in 2000